Choryeuromyia xenisma is a species of flies in the subfamily Eurychoromyiinae.

Distribution
Costa Rica.

References

Lauxaniidae
Lauxanioidea genera
Diptera of South America